Limacia lucida is a sea slug, a species of dorid nudibranch. It is a marine gastropod mollusc in the family Polyceridae.

Distribution
Limacia lucida was described from Simon's Bay, Cape of Good Hope, South Africa. It has been treated as a synonym of Limacia clavigera.

References

Endemic fauna of South Africa
Polyceridae
Gastropods described in 1854